Step Lively is a 1944 American musical film directed by Tim Whelan and starring Frank Sinatra. Step Lively was based on the 1937 play Room Service, by Allen Boretz and John Murray. It was a remake of the 1938 RKO film Room Service, starring the Marx Brothers, Lucille Ball, and Ann Miller.

Plot

Theatrical producer Gordon Miller is keeping his fingers crossed that his newest play will be a success so that he can pay off his massive hotel bill. Miller and his entire cast can live at the hotel on credit thanks to the generosity of the hotel manager, Joe Gribble, who is Miller's brother-in-law.

Wagner, a company auditor, arrives unexpectedly, as does playwright Glenn Russell, who has left his small town hoping to collect a large amount of (non-existent) royalties on his play. Russell ends up taking a lead musical role in his own production.

Miller suddenly has mixed feelings about his own play, as his girlfriend Christine Marlowe has fallen head-over-heels for playwright Russell; and to break up the romance means sabotaging his own production.

Cast
 Frank Sinatra as Glenn Russell
 George Murphy as Gordon Miller
 Adolphe Menjou as Wagner
 Gloria DeHaven as Christine Marlowe
 Walter Slezak as Joe Gribble
 Eugene Pallette as Simon Jenkins
 Wally Brown as Binion
 Alan Carney as Harry
 Grant Mitchell as Dr. Gibbs
 Anne Jeffreys as Miss Abbott
 Richard Davies

Songs 
All songs composed by Jule Styne (music) and Sammy Cahn (lyrics).

• Where Does Love Begin? – Performed by Gloria DeHaven, George Murphy and chorus;  Reprised by Frank Sinatra and Anne Jeffreys

• Come Out, Come Out, Wherever You Are – Performed by Gloria DeHaven, Frank Sinatra and chorus

• As Long As There's Music – Performed by Frank Sinatra

• Some Other Time – Performed by Frank Sinatra and Gloria DeHaven

• Why Must There Be an Op'ning Song? – Performed by Anne Jeffreys

• Ask the Madame – Performed by George Murphy, Gloria DeHaven and chorus

Reviews
Bosley Crowther, reviewing for The New York Times, called Step Lively a star vehicle for Frank Sinatra; although the scenes with Sinatra "perceptibly hobble[d] the farce." Crowther compared him unfavorably to Eddie Albert, stating that "when [the remaining cast] are left alone to play 'Room Service' they make this an up-and-coming film."

Awards
The film was nominated an Academy Award for Best Art Direction (Albert S. D'Agostino, Carroll Clark, Darrell Silvera, Claude E. Carpenter).

References

External links
 
 

1944 films
1944 musical films
American black-and-white films
Remakes of American films
American musical films
American films based on plays
Films directed by Tim Whelan
Films set in hotels
Films set in New York City
RKO Pictures films
1940s English-language films
1940s American films